Receptor-type tyrosine-protein phosphatase-like N, also called "IA-2", is an enzyme that in humans is encoded by the PTPRN gene.

Overview 
The IA-2 protein encoded by PTPRN gene is a member of the protein tyrosine phosphatase (PTP) family and PTPRN subfamily. PTPs are known to be signaling molecules that regulate a variety of cellular processes including cell growth, differentiation, mitotic cycle, and oncogenic transformation. This PTP possesses an extracellular region, a single transmembrane region, and a single catalytic domain, and thus represents a receptor-type PTP. This PTP was found to be an autoantigen that is reactive with insulin-dependent diabetes mellitus (IDDM) patient sera, and thus may be a potential target of autoimmunity in diabetes mellitus.

Structure 
IA-2 and IA-2b belong to family of protein tyrosine phosphatase-like (PTP) molecules. IA-2 is a transmembrane protein with 979 amino acids encoded by a gene on human chromosome 2q35. Similarly, IA-2b has 986 amino acids, and it is located on human chromosome 7q36. The IA-2 is synthesised as a pro-protein of 110 kDa which is then converted by post-translational modifications into a 130 kDa protein.

The IA-2 and IA-2b shares 74% identity within the intracellular domains, but only 27% in the extracellular domains.

The IA-2 protein is expressed mainly in cells of neuroendocrine origin, such as pancreatic islets and brain. The IA-2 protein is localised in the membrane of secretory granules of pancreatic β-cells.

Function 
Even though the IA-2/b has a similar structure to other PTPs, there is a critical amino acid replacement at position 911 (Asp for Ala), which is required for enzymatic activity. These proteins thus fail to show enzymatic activity and their function remains unclear. They could play role in insulin secretory pathways, sorting out proteins or regulates other PTPs.

Autoantigen in Type 1 Diabetes 
The IA-2 is a second major autoantigen in Type 1 Diabetes. IA-2 autoantibodies are found in 78% type 1 diabetics at the time of diagnosis. It has been shown that the autoantibodies exclusively react with the intracellular domain, also called juxtamembrane, but not with the extracellular domain of IA-2/b.

It is suggested that IA-2 and not the IA-2b is the primary PTP-like autoantigen in Type 1 Diabetes. The juxtamembrane region in IA-2 is probably the early antibody target.  Followed by multiple epitope spreading which is believed to take place in the early development of the disease.

Autoantibodies in Type 1 Diabetes 
Autoantibodies targeting pancreatic islet cell can occur years before a hyperglycaemia is established, therefore these autoantibodies are used in prediction of Type 1 Diabetes.

Islet cell autoantibodies are detected in serum, including ICA (islet cell cytoplasma autoantibodies), IAA (autoantibodies to insulin), GAD        (glutamic acid decarboxylase), IA-2 (insulinoma-associated protein 2), and ZnT8 (zinc transporter of islet beta cells).

However, it is not clear if a primary autoantigen exists and immune reaction against other molecules results from secondary antigen spreading, or multiple molecules represent a primary target.

The first autoimmune targets are usually aimed against insulin or GAD, and it is unique to observe IA-2 or ZnT8 as the first autoantibodies. What set off the appearance of a first β-cell targeting autoantibody is unclear.

The IAA antibody usually appears early in life, median age is 1.49. Presence of GAD as the first autoantibody is more widespread with median age 4.04. It is relatively rare to see IA-2 as the primary autoantibody, median age 3.03. Interestingly, secondary autoantibodies follow different patterns to mask the primary autoantibodies, if both are combined. If the primary autoantibody is IAA then GAD briskly appears with peak of 2 years age. Secondary IAA usually occurs after GAD, where the age distribution is over wide range.

It is unknown whether the appearance of autoantibodies corresponds with insulitis process in the pancreas and if so, what is the combination of the autoantibodies.

Interactions 

PTPRN has been shown to interact with SPTBN4.

References

Further reading